Nazim-e-Sukkur is the Mayor who heads the Sukkur Municipal Corporation (SMC) which controls the Local Government system of Sukkur.

Sukkur Municipal Corporation 
There are 26 Union Councils in Sukkur Municipal Corporation(SMC), the body which controls local government of Sukkur. The Union Councils elect their Chairmen and Vice Chairmen who then elect their Mayor and Deputy Mayor respectively.

List of mayors 
Following is the list of mayors of Sukkur in recent times

Mayor elections history

Mayor elections 2015 

As a result, PPP mayor and deputy mayors were elected as Mayors of Sukkur. They took oath on August 30, 2016.

See also 

 Mayor of Karachi
 Mayor of Hyderabad

References 

Sukkur